Everything Bad & Beautiful is the title of a live stage show and album performed/recorded by singer/comedian/actress Sandra Bernhard. The show ran in 2006 in New York City at the Daryl Roth Theater. In the performance Bernhard does what she is best known for: she rips apart celebrity culture while commenting on events of the time. Among the topics she addresses: Britney Spears, Laura Bush, Condoleezza Rice, Bob Dylan, Mariah Carey, golf and the war on terror.

The album, released in 2006, is a live recording of her one-woman show of the same title; it combines comedic monologues and musical performances. It was released by Breaking Records and was originally sold through the website and in the lobby of the live show. Unlike the majority of her other CD releases, it was a professionally manufactured CD and not a home-made CD-R.

In 2007 the label acquired a distribution deal for the album and a re-released version with an alternate track listing was released. It has slightly alternate artwork (only "one Sandra" appears on the cover instead of 3) and features bonus digital video content.

Most of the songs on the CD are covers of other people's songs. They include Christina Aguilera, Missy Elliott, Lita Ford, Vanity 6, Sheila E., Bob Dylan, Pink and Prince.

Track Listing (First Edition)

 Beautiful
 De La Guarda / Broadway
 L.A.
 Kerry / Laura Bush / Lynn Cheney
 Condoleezza Rice & Rosa Parks
 Pussycat
 Motherhood
 The Flame
 Thanksgiving
 Flint, Michigan
 Bob Dylan
 Like a Rolling Stone
 Shabbat
 Mariah Carey & Britney Spears
 Sara
 Out of Tears
 Hugh Hefner
 I Hate Golf / Mock the Poor
 Just Like a Pill/Kiss Me Deadly
 Christian lady
 Medley (My House / Nasty Girl / I Would Die 4 U)

Track Listing (Enhanced Version)

 Beautiful
 De La Guarda / Broadway
 L.A.
 Kerry / Laura Bush / Lynn Cheney
 Condoleezza Rice & Rosa Parks
 Motherhood
 The Flame
 Thanksgiving
 Flint, Michigan
 Bob Dylan
 Like a Rolling Stone
 Shabbat
 Mariah Carey & Britney Spears
 Sara
 Hugh Hefner
 I Hate Golf / Mock the Poor
 Pill / Kiss Me Deadly
 Perfection
Bonus Video Footage:
 (Bonus) "Everything Bad and Beautiful" Promo
 (Bonus) Sandra Bernhard: Live at Joe's Pub [1]

iTunes Bonus Tracks
 (Bonus) New York / Ali MacGraw
 (Bonus) L.A. / Lenny Kravitz
 (Bonus) Sandra Bernhard: Live at Joe's Pub [2]

Sandra Bernhard albums
2006 live albums
2006 video albums
Live video albums
Covers albums
2000s comedy albums